Immaculée Nahayo Nyandwi (1948 - 17 November 2018) was a Burundian politician who was President of the National Assembly of Burundi from 16 August 2005 to 2007, the first woman to hold this position in Burundi. She was also elected as Speaker of the African Parliamentary Union (APU) to March 2007.

Political career
An ethnic Hutu member of the National Council for the Defense of Democracy-Forces for the Defense of Democracy (CNDD-FDD), she replaced Jean Minani of the Front for Democracy in Burundi (FRODEBU), who had been National Assembly president since 2002.

She subsequently served as Minister of National Solidarity, Repatriation, National Reconstruction, Human Rights, & Gender  beginning in July 2007.  She has been elected as Adviser in COMESA.

Personal life
Born in Gatara (Kayanza Province), Nahayo was the mother of six children. Her husband, Simon Nyandwi, was interior minister until his death on 22 March 2005.

Nyandwi died on 17 November 2018 in Brussels, Belgium, aged 70.

See also
List of presidents of the National Assembly of Burundi

References

1948 births
2018 deaths
Hutu people
Presidents of the National Assembly (Burundi)
National Council for the Defense of Democracy – Forces for the Defense of Democracy politicians
Government ministers of Burundi
21st-century women politicians
People from Kayanza Province
Women government ministers of Burundi